Wenxing Subdistrict is a subdistrict and the county seat of Xiangyin in Hunan, China. It was reformed through the amalgamation of Bainihu Township,  Changkang Town, Shitang Township,  the former Wenxing Town and Yuanjiapu Town on November 20, 2015. The town is located in the west central Xiangyin County, it is bordered by Miluo City to the west, Jinlong Town and Yuhua Township to the south, Helonghu Town and Jinghe Township to the west, Santang Town to the north. Through the amalgamation of the village-level divisions in 2016, it was divided into 23 villages and 27 communities, its seat is Xieping Village.

History
After the establishment of the Communist State in 1949, the Chengguan District was set up. It was renamed "Chengguan Town" in 1951. During the Great Leap Forward, its name was changed to "Bayi Commune". It was renamed "Wenxing Town" in 1995 and "Wenxing Subdistrict" in 2019.

Geography
It lies at the eastern of Xiangyin County, bordering Helonghu Town to the west, the towns of Yuhua and Jinghe to the south, the towns of Dongtang and Santang to the north, and Baishui Town to the east.

The Xiang River flows through the town south to north.

The East Lake is a lake in the subdistrict.

Hospitals
Xiangyin County No.1 Hospital
Chinese Medicine Hospital of Xiangyin County

Transportation
The G0421 Xuchang–Guangzhou Expressway passes across the subdistrict north to south.

The National Highway G240 is a south–north highway in the subdistrict.

Tourist attractions
Wangbin Park
East Lake Park
Yangsha Lake Tourist Resort
Xiangyin Confucian Temple
Nanquan Temple
Wenxing Pagoda
Zuo Zongtang Cultural Park

Gallery

References

Xiangyin County
County seats in Hunan